Choqluy-e Olya (also Romanized as Choqlūy-e ‘Olyā; also known as Chaghalū-ye Bālā, Chaghalū-ye ‘Olyā, Chaghlooy Olya, Chonglu, Choqlū-ye ‘Olyā, Chūqlū-ye ‘Olyā, and Jaghalū-ye ‘Olyā) is a village in Qeshlaqat-e Afshar Rural District, Afshar District, Khodabandeh County, Zanjan Province, Iran. At the 2006 census, its population was 120, in 24 families.

References 

Populated places in Khodabandeh County